Defending champion Chris Evert defeated Virginia Ruzici in the final, 6–0, 6–3 to win the women's singles tennis title at the 1980 French Open. It was her fourth French Open singles title and her tenth major singles title overall.

Seeds
The seeded players are listed below. Chris Evert is the champion; others show the round in which they were eliminated.

  Chris Evert (champion)
  Billie Jean King (quarterfinals)
  Wendy Turnbull (quarterfinals)
  Virginia Wade (third round)
  Dianne Fromholtz (semifinals)
  Kathy Jordan (quarterfinals)
  Hana Mandlíková (semifinals)
  Virginia Ruzici (finalist)
  Regina Maršíková (withdrew before the tournament began)
  Sue Barker (withdrew before the tournament began)
  Andrea Jaeger (first round)
  Sylvia Hanika (third round)
  Caroline Stoll (second round)
  Mima Jaušovec (third round)
  Kate Latham (first round)
  Bettina Bunge (third round)

Qualifying

Draw

Key
 Q = Qualifier
 WC = Wild card
 LL = Lucky loser
 r = Retired

Finals

Earlier rounds

Section 1

Section 2

Section 3

Section 4

References

External links
1980 French Open – Women's draws and results at the International Tennis Federation

Women's Singles
French Open by year – Women's singles
French Open - Women's Singles
1980 in women's tennis
1980 in French women's sport